The Secretary of State for Business and Trade, is a Secretary of State in the Government of the United Kingdom, with responsibility for the Department for Business and Trade. The incumbent is a member of the Cabinet of the United Kingdom. 

The incumbent Business Secretary is Kemi Badenoch who was appointed by Rishi Sunak on 7 February 2023.

Responsibilities
Corresponding to what is generally known as a Commerce Minister in many other countries, the Business Secretary's remit includes:

 Relations with domestic and international business
 Policy relating to deregulation
 Policy relating to international trade and trade agreements
 Import and export policy

History 
During the government of Sir Alec Douglas-Home, the then President of the Board of Trade, Edward Heath, was given in addition the job of Secretary of State for Industry, Trade and Regional Development. This title was not continued under Harold Wilson, but when Heath became Prime Minister in 1970 he decided to merge functions of the Board of Trade and the Ministry of Technology to create the Department of Trade and Industry. The head of this department became known as Secretary of State for Trade and Industry and also retained the title of President of the Board of Trade.

When Harold Wilson re-entered office in March 1974, the office was split into the Department of Trade, the Department of Industry and the Department of Prices and Consumer Protection, resulting in the creation of three new positions: Secretary of State for Industry, Secretary of State for Prices and Consumer Protection, and Secretary of State for Trade. The title President of the Board of Trade became the secondary title of the Secretary of State for Trade. By 1979 the Department of Prices and Consumer Protection was abolished by the incoming Conservative government and its responsibilities were reintegrated into the Department of Trade. Furthermore, 1983 the offices of trade and industry were remerged and the title of Secretary of State for Trade and Industry was recreated. When Michael Heseltine held this office, he preferred to be known by the older title of President of the Board of Trade, and this practice was also followed by Ian Lang and Margaret Beckett. Heseltine's decision to reuse the old title caused some controversy, and it was discovered that the Board of Trade had not in fact met since the mid-nineteenth century.

Under Gordon Brown's premiership there were two re-namings of the role and three re-alignments of responsibility. In his first cabinet of 2007, he called the post Secretary of State for Business, Enterprise and Regulatory Reform. With this change, the Better Regulation Executive was added to the department but the Office of Science and Innovation was lost. In 2008, the title remained the same but responsibility for energy was lost. In 2009, the Department for Innovation, Universities and Skills was merged into the existing department and the post became Secretary of State for Business, Innovation and Skills.

In July 2016, Prime Minister Theresa May decided to merge the Department for Energy and Climate Change into this department with the responsibilities for post-19 education and skills being returned to the Department for Education resulting in the position being renamed to Secretary of State for Business, Energy and Industrial Strategy. At the same time in July 2016, the post of President of the Board of Trade was transferred to the newly created post of Secretary of State for International Trade.

The current role of Secretary of State for Business and Trade was established on 7 February 2023 after a cabinet reshuffle by Prime Minister Rishi Sunak saw the dissolution of the Department for Business, Energy and Industrial Strategy and its responsibilities transferred to three new departments: Department for Business and Trade, the Department for Science, Innovation and Technology, and the Department for Energy Security and Net Zero. The new Department for Business and Trade absorbed the business policy responsibilities of BEIS, and the functions of the former Department for International Trade.

List of secretaries of state

Secretary of State for Industry, Trade and Regional Development (1963–1964)

Secretary of State for Trade and Industry (1970–1974)

Secretaries of State for Industry; Prices; and Trade (1974–1983)

Secretary of State for Trade and Industry (1983–2007)

Secretary of State for Business, Enterprise and Regulatory Reform (2007–2009)

Secretary of State for Business, Innovation and Skills (2009–2016)

Secretary of State for Energy and Climate Change (2008–2016)

Secretary of State for Business, Energy and Industrial Strategy (2016–2023)

Secretary of State for Business and Trade (since 2023)

References

Lists of government ministers of the United Kingdom
Ministerial offices in the United Kingdom
Business in the United Kingdom
Department for Business, Innovation and Skills